Àngels Ribé (born 1943 in Barcelona) is considered one of the most important Catalan conceptual artists of the 70s. With a strong international presence, she worked alongside such artists as Vito Acconci, Laurie Anderson, Gordon Matta-Clark, Lawrence Weiner, Hannah Wilke, Martha Wilson, Francesc Torres, and Krzysztof Wodiczko, among others.

Biography 
Ribé moved from Barcelona to  Paris in 1966, and in 1969 began creating sculpture and installations, later actions and performances, working primarily with space and the body.

In 1972 Ribé moved to the United States, where she lived and worked for several months in Chicago before settling in New York City.  She returned to Barcelona in 1980.

Work 
Ribe's work, contextualized in the conceptual art of the late 60s and 70s, utilized nontraditional material, which she gradually discarded to concentrate on the ephemeral—light and shadow—and the location of the body in space.  In Catalonia, her work is in the collections of the Vila Casas Foundation and the Barcelona Museum of Contemporary Art MACBA. Her work from 1969 to 1984 was the subject of a retrospective at MACBA in 2011.

Main works 
 Laberint (1969)
 Acció al parc (1969)
 Escuma (1969)
  3 punts (1970–1973)
 Transport d'un raig de llum (1972)
 Invisible Geometry 3 (1973)
 Light Interaction and Wind Interaction (1973)
 N.A.M.E. (1974) Performance
 Véhicule (1974) Performance at la Galérie de Mont-real.
 Two Main Subjective Points on an Objective Trajectory (1975)
 Can't Go Home (1977)
 Amagueu les nines, que passen els lladres
 Triangle (1978)
 Ornamentació (1979)
 Paisatge (1983)

Main exhibits

Awards 
 2012 - Premi Nacional de Cultura

References

Further reading

External links 
 Official Àngels Ribé Website
 Interview to Àngels Ribé in Spanish

People from Barcelona
1943 births
Artists from Catalonia
Living people